Međimurje is a small historical and geographical region in Northern Croatia comprising the area between the two large rivers, Mura and Drava, and roughly corresponding to the administrative division of Međimurje County.

Overview

The region consists of the alluvial plain in its southeastern part (so called  or 'Lower Međimurje') and the slopes of the Alpine foothills in its northwestern part ( – 'Upper Međimurje' –  or sometimes , approx. 'the Međimurje Hills'). While Upper Međimurje is covered with groves, meadows, vineyards and orchards, Lower Međimurje is largely used for tillage, which includes fields of cereals, maize, potato, as well as vegetable farming.

The region has been inhabited since the Neolithic and Bronze Age. From the 1st century it was under the control of the Roman Empire and part of the province of Pannonia. In the Early Middle Ages the Slavs settled the region, which later became part of the Duchy of Pannonian Croatia, then the Kingdom of Croatia and (from 1102) the Kingdom of Croatia in personal union with Hungary. Over the centuries it was possessed by many noble families such as the Lacković, Celjski, Ernušt, Zrinski, Althann or Feštetić.

According to the 1527 election in Cetin Međimurje fell under the rule of the Austrian Habsburgs and remained part of the Habsburg monarchy (later the Austrian Empire and Austria-Hungary) until the end of the First World War in 1918. From 1720 Međimurje was officially part of the Hungarian Zala County.

It was occupied in late December 1918, and proclaimed a part of the newly formed Kingdom of Serbs, Croats and Slovenes (later known as Yugoslavia) by a popular assembly held in the region's largest town Čakovec. This was confirmed in the Treaty of Trianon. Since 1991 the region has been part of the Republic of Croatia.

See also

Regions of Croatia
History of Croatia 
Geography of Croatia 
Hungarian Revolution of 1848
Međimurje horse
Međimurska gibanica
Sveta Jelena

References

External links
 Text of the history of Međimurje in the Encyclopedia of the Miroslav Krleža Institute of Lexicography 
 Međimurje – History, Identity and Migrations   
 Međimurje in 1918

Timeline of feudal lords of Međimurje

Međimurje
Historical regions in Croatia
Historical regions in the Kingdom of Hungary